Maurice Crum Sr. (born April 19, 1969) is a former American football linebacker who played college football at the University of Miami and attended Hillsborough High School in Tampa, Florida. He was a consensus All-American in 1990. He was also a member of the Tampa Bay Buccaneers, Orlando Thunder, Saskatchewan Roughriders and Orlando Predators. His son, Maurice Crum Jr., played football at Notre Dame.

References

External links
Just Sports Stats

Living people
1969 births
Players of American football from Tampa, Florida
Players of Canadian football from Tampa, Florida
American football linebackers
Canadian football linebackers
African-American players of American football
African-American players of Canadian football
Miami Hurricanes football players
Orlando Thunder players
Saskatchewan Roughriders players
Orlando Predators players
All-American college football players
21st-century African-American people
20th-century African-American sportspeople